The Russkaya Pravda (Rus' Justice, Rus' Truth, or Russian Justice; , Pravda Rusĭskaya (13th century, 1280), Правда Руськая, Pravda Rus'kaya (second half of the 15th century); , Russkaya Pravda;) was the legal code of Kievan Rus' and the subsequent Rus' principalities during the times of feudal division. It was written at the beginning of the 12th century and remade during many centuries. The basis of the Russkaya Pravda, Pravda of Yaroslav was written at the beginning of the 11th century. The Russkaya Pravda was a main source of Old Rus' Law.

In spite of great influence of Byzantine legislation on the contemporary world, and in spite of great cultural and commercial ties between Byzantium and Kievan Rus', the Russkaya Pravda bore no similarity whatsoever to that of the Byzantine Empire.  The absence of capital and corporal punishment rather reflects Norse jurisprudence.

Editions

Three recensions of Russkaya Pravda are known: the Short Edition (Kratkaya), the Extensive Edition (Prostrannaya), and the Abridged Edition (Sokrashchyonnaya). Over 110 extant copies dating from the 13th to the 18th centuries are preserved, included  in various manuscripts: chronicles and compilations. Of these, over 100 copies, including the oldest preserved, are of the Extensive Edition.

This code was discovered by the historian Vasily Tatischev in the text of one of the Novgorod  chronicles and brought to the attention of the Russian Academy of Sciences in 1738. The first commented edition of the text was published by August Ludwig von Schlözer in 1767.

Genesis and evolution 
Pravda Rus'skaya’s legal regulations reflected the evolution of the social relations in the Rus' of the 11th-13th centuries.  Common law, Knyaz legislation, and legal proceedings represented the basis of “RP”.

The Short Edition of Rus' Justice contains two apparently distinct parts, called by researchers Pravda Yaroslava (Yaroslav’s Law, ca. 1017), otherwise known as Drevneyshaya Pravda (the Oldest Justice) of Yaroslav the Wise, and Pravda Yaroslavichey (The Law by Yaroslav’s sons, ca. 1054). Some indicate other distinct components of the text, possibly added later.

The Yaroslav’s Law comprised legal regulations of feudal law along with the archaic regulations that could be traced back to the primitive communal system. According to a popular theory, it was promulgated in order to settle a conflict between Konstantin Dobrynich, a posadnik of Novgorod, and the Varangian population of the city.

Subsequent development and improvement of the Rus' Justice took place in times of Yaroslav's sons and his grandson Vladimir Monomakh. New provisions are believed to have been added to Pravda Rus'skaya after the revolts in Kiev, Novgorod, and Rostov-Suzdal province in 1068–1071.

In the arising Russian state, the Pravda Rus'skaya was replaced in 1497 by the Sudebnik, the Code of Law. Several centuries earlier, new legal codes were promulgated in Pskov and Novgorod.

Institutions 
“Pravda Yaroslavichey” increased responsibility of a given community for killing knyaz’es soldiers,  (“”, a privileged servant of knyazs or boyars), starostas (“starosta”, a representative from the low-ranking administration of a knyaz),  (“”, a low-ranking soldier in the army of a knyaz) and other servants on their own territory. “Pravda Yaroslavichey” provided severe punishment for arson, deliberate cattle mutilation, and collective encroachment on rich people's property. After the 1113 Riot in Kiev, an exorbitant interest law was introduced that limited financial operations of moneylenders.

The Pravda stabilized the system of feudal relations and social inequality. During 11th-13th centuries it made new laws for the smerds (“smerd” – a feudal-dependent peasant),  (“” - a feudal-dependent peasant, who could become free after paying off his “”, a feudal loan),  (“” – a feudal-dependent peasant, who could be killed or sold like a slave) etc. It also reflects the role of the court of knyaz’, by increasing and giving various forms of punishment and penalties. It instituted fines that benefited the knyaz’ or his administration with diminished compensation to the victims.

In an attempt to abolish the  blood feud  (that was quite common at that time), the Pravda narrowed its “usage” and limited the number of avengers to the closest relatives of the dead. If there were no avengers on the victim's side, the killer had to pay a fine (called “vyra”) in favour of the knyaz’ and partial compensation to the relatives of the victim (the killer's community had to help him pay his fine). If a woman was killed, one would have to pay half of the regular fine (called “poluvir’ye”, half of “vyra”). The Pravda also protected the health and honor of the free members of the feudal society and provided financial compensation for mutilation or insult by word or deed. The Pravda had a comprehensive system of punishments and penalties for larceny in a city or countryside, deliberate damage to forests, hunting grounds or lands, trespassing etc. It also regulated debt  between individuals and contained articles of liability and hereditary law. The Pravda made use of witnesses, oaths and of the trial by water or iron, a kind of a last-resort test used to prove defendant's innocence or guilt in legal proceedings. The legal process also included testimony witnesses, evidence, collecting or hot pursuit. Investigators had to check for false accusations, as well. These were the first steps towards forensic science.

See also

Notes

Some editions
 English translation of Short Russkaya Pravda by Daniel H. Kaiser: Source: The Laws of Rus' - Tenth to Fifteenth Centuries, tr., ed. Daniel H. Kaiser (Salt Lake City: Charles Schlacks Publisher, 1992), 15-19.
 English translation of Vast Russkaya Pravda by Daniel H. Kaiser: Source: The Laws of Rus' - Tenth to Fifteenth Centuries, tr., ed. Daniel H. Kaiser (Salt Lake City: Charles Schlacks Publisher, 1992), 20-34.
 Main edition: Pravda Russkaya / ed. by Boris Grekov. - Moscow; Leningrad: publisher of the Academy of Sciences of the USSR. - Vol. 1: Texts. - 1940. Vol. 2: Commentaries. - 1947. Vol. 3: Facsimile of the texts. - 1963..
 Memorials of Russian Law / ed. by Serafim Yushkov. Issue 1: Memorials of Law of Kievan State of the 10th-12th centuries / Aleksandr Zimin. - Moscow: Gosyurizdat (State Juridical Publisher), 1952. - 287 p..

Some references
  Mikhail Tikhomirov, "A study of Russkaya Pravda"
 Leonid Biletsky, The Ruska Pravda and its textual History, Edited by George D. Knysh University of Manitoba, Winnipeg - 1993
  History of legal literature of Russia (full text and notes in Russian)
 Padokh, Yaroslav. Ruskaia Pravda. Encyclopedia of Ukraine. Vol. 4. 1993. 

East Slavic manuscripts
Society of Kievan Rus'
Medieval legal codes
Legal history of Ukraine
Legal history of Russia
Cyrillic manuscripts
13th-century manuscripts